"Indio" is a song by Australian pop group Indecent Obsession. It was released as their second single from their second studio album of the same name (1992). The song was released in July 1992 and peaked at number 41 on the ARIA Chart.

Track listing
 CD Single (AU) (D16036)
 "Indio" (Single Mix) - 3:43	
 "Cry For Freedom" (Single Mix) - 4:47	
 "Indio" (Rhythm Mix) - 4:11

 Maxi (MCD 30066)
 "Indio" (Single Edit) - 3:39
 "Indio" (Rhythm Mix) - 4:08
 "Indio" (Aja Chunky Re-Mix) - 6:33
 "Indio" (Aja Xavier Dub) - 5:11

Chart performance

References

1992 songs
1992 singles
Indecent Obsession songs